Roger-Gérard Schwartzenberg (born 17 April 1943 in Pau, Pyrénées-Atlantiques) is a French politician of the Radical Party of the Left (French: Parti Radical de Gauche, PRG). He has been a Deputy to the European Parliament (1979-1983), a Deputy to the (French) National Assembly (1986-2007; he was defeated in the 2007 elections, but regained his seat in 2012) and a Government Minister (1983-1986 et 2000-2002). He is a professor at Panthéon-Assas University. From 1981 to 1983 he was President of the Movement of Radicals of the Left (Mouvement des Radicaux de Gauche, the forerunner of the PRG) in the French Parliament.

He is also known as a popular political theoretician especially in his book L'etat Spectacle originally written in 1977 (Flammarion) and subsequently rewritten to include female political role models (Angela Merkel in particular) in 2009 (Plon) and his other major work La Politique du Mensonge (Odile Jacob 1998).  He posits politics as a shadow show with stereotypical characters and plots.  Main actors include "The Man of the People" (Jimmy Carter), "The Hero" (Putin), "Father/Mother of the Nation" (originally François Mitterrand and subsequently Angela Merkel) and "The charmer" (Blair).

Strategically his analysis is allied to game theory where politicians play roles to contrast with their opponents and provides a tool for analysing electoral tactics.  His work is virtually unknown in the Anglo-Saxon world.

References

1943 births
Living people
People from Pau, Pyrénées-Atlantiques
French people of German descent
Politicians from Nouvelle-Aquitaine
Radical Party of the Left politicians
Radical Movement politicians
Government ministers of France
Deputies of the 8th National Assembly of the French Fifth Republic
Deputies of the 9th National Assembly of the French Fifth Republic
Deputies of the 10th National Assembly of the French Fifth Republic
Deputies of the 11th National Assembly of the French Fifth Republic
Deputies of the 12th National Assembly of the French Fifth Republic
Deputies of the 14th National Assembly of the French Fifth Republic
Academic staff of Paris 2 Panthéon-Assas University